Bokaro, officially known as Bokaro Steel City is a planned city in Jharkhand, India. It is fourth largest and most populous city in the state. It is one of the planned cities of India. Bokaro is the administrative headquarters of Bokaro district. The city is located on the banks of Garga River and on the fringes of Bokaro river and is surrounded by hill ranges at Giridih and Ramgarh districts. It is one of the most peaceful cities in India. As per 2011 census, the city's population was 563,417 and 1,100,000 of its metropolitan area. The city span across 183 km in geographic area.

Marafari is the oldest settlement in Bokaro which was just a village during the time of Mughals and Sultanates. The nearby cities of Purulia was ruled by Maharaja of Kashipur. Manbhum region also covered Bokaro which was ruled by Mughal and Sultanates. During British rule, Chas - a suburban area of Bokaro was notified. After independence, it became a part of Jharkhand state. Bokaro Steel City is the headquarters of the Bokaro District as well as Koylanchal range (Bokaro, Dhanbad and Giridih) and is also one of the headquarters of the Police IG zone, apart from Ranchi and Dumka, covering seven districts- Hazaribagh, Dhanbad, Giridih, Koderma, Chatra, Bokaro, and Ramgarh (North Chotanagpur Division).

Bokaro has emerged as a commercial, industrial, healthcare, sports, educational and startup hub. It is India's first global active city (GAC). The city hosts tourist spots such as Jawaharlal Nehru Biological Park, Pindrajora, Tenughat Dam etc. It is home to Steel Authority of India, Bharat Petroleum Corporation Limited, Oil and Natural Gas Corporation, Jaypee Cement, Orica, Vedanta Resources, Dalmia Cement, Electrosteel Castings and various other industries.

Geography 
Bokaro district consists of undulating uplands on the Chota Nagpur Plateau with the Damodar River cutting a valley right across. The East Bokaro Coalfield located in the Bermo-Phusro area and small intrusions of Jharia Coalfield make Bokaro a coal rich district. In 1965, one of the largest steel manufacturing units in the country, Bokaro Steel Plant, operated by Steel Authority of India Limited, was set-up at Bokaro Steel City. The Damodar Valley Corporation established its first thermal power station at Bokaro (Thermal). The soil is generally infertile and agriculture is mostly rain-fed.

Bounded on the east by Dhanbad and Purulia, on the west by Ramgarh and Hazaribagh, on the north by Giridih and on the south by Ranchi. It is accessible through National Highway NH 143 & NH-18. The city has the total area of 183 km. It includes the suburban area of Chas Municipal Corporation. There are many national highways crossing the city of Bokaro. Each sector has shopping centres, playgrounds, schools, recreational areas and health centres as entire city is planned with avenues and residential areas as well as commercial areas. Bokaro was one of the first planned cities in the state of Jharkhand.

Demographics

According to the 2011 Census of India, Bokaro Steel City is the 86th largest urban agglomeration in India, and the 4th largest city in Jharkhand.

According to the 2011 Census of India, Bokaro Steel City Urban Agglomeration had a total population of 563,417, of which males were 299,232 and females 264,185. Bokaro Steel City Urban Agglomeration is composed of Bokaro Steel City (Census Town), Chas (Nagar Nigam) and Bandhgora (CT). The UA had an effective literacy rate (7+ population) of 84.87%, with male literacy of 92.27% and female literacy of 76.50%. A new metropolitan area of Bokaro has been planned named Greater Bokaro and population is expected to be around 1,100,000.

Bokaro Steel City had a population of 413,934, of which males were 220,088 and females were 193,846. Population in the age range of 0-6 was 48,834. The effective literacy rate (7+ population) was 84.94%, with male literacy of 92.35% and female literacy of 76.54%.

The major languages spoken are Hindi,  Khortha,  Urdu, Bengali, Santhali and Maithili with Hindi and Santali have official status and Urdu as second official language. A Russian colony was located in the city housing Soviet communities. Kannada, Tamil, Malayalam and Telugu speaking and various other South Indian communities also settled in the city.

Infrastructure
According to the District Census Handbook 2011, Bokaro, Bokaro Steel City  covered an area of 162.91 km2. Among the civic amenities, it had 415 km roads with both open and closed drains, the protected water supply involved tapwater from treated and untreated sources, overhead tank, service reservoir. It had 67,083 domestic electric connections, 10,283 road lighting points. Among the medical facilities, it had 9 hospitals (with 1,200 beds), 2 dispensaries, 2 health centres, 1 family welfare centre, 1 maternity and child welfare centre, 1 maternity home, 5 nursing homes (with 120 beds), 30 medicine shops. It had 1 polytechnic, 2 recognised shorthand, typewriting and vocational training centres, 1 non-formal educational centre (Sarva Siksha Abhiyan). Among the social, recreational and cultural facilities it had 2 stadiums, 3 cinema theatres, 8 auditorium/ community halls, 9 public libraries, 9 reading rooms. An important commodity it produced was steel products. It had the branch offices of 30 nationalised banks, 12 private commercial banks, 1 cooperative bank.

Economy

The economy of the city is primarily depended on the integrated steel plant established by Steel Authority of India . The Bokaro Steel Plant was established with the collaboration of Soviet Union when the First Prime Minister Jawahar Lal Nehru desired to establish a steel plant in the region. Bokaro Steel Plant expansion to extend its capacity from 4.5 million metric tons to 7.5 million metric tonnes in 2010-2011.

Vedanta Electrosteel Castings Limited - A Kolkata-based water pipe manufacturer acquired  of land  from the city and has erected its 2.2 MTPA steel plant. The company has invested close to Rs 80 Bn (US$1.6 Bn) on this project which was operational from 2010.

ONGC Bokaro operates the Bokaro Coal Bed Methane (CBM) block BK-CBM-2001/1 with 80 per cent stake while the remaining 20 per cent is with Indian Oil Corp (IOC). It plans to invest ₨ 8.23 billion from 2017 to 2018 to achieve a peak production of 0.9 million standard cubic meters per day. Dalmia Cement Bharat Limited (DCBL) operates a 1.5 Million Tonne cement plant at Bokaro utilising slag supply from Bokaro Steel Plant.

Future projects
SAIL-POSCO JV Steel Plant: Steel minister Sri Virbhadra Singh has announced another new steel plant for Bokaro as part of a joint venture with Posco and SAIL by using FINEX technologies for high quality steel.

Bharat Petroleum Corporation Limited - BPCL will set up a LPG bottling plant and POL (petroleum, oil and lubricants) terminal in Bokaro, the foundation stone of which was laid on 11 August 2019.

Software Technology Parks of India - STPI will setup an IT Park.

Transport

Air

The nearest commercial airport is at Ranchi, named Birsa Munda Airport, at a distance of 120 km.
Bokaro Airport is an unserviced airport with no scheduled commercial flights. However, the Government of India has planned to connect Bokaro to the regional hub of Patna and an international airport in Kolkata through the UDAN regional airport development scheme, opening the airport up could see commercial flights by 2022.

SpiceJet airline has been awarded under the second phase of the UDAN Scheme to cater unserved market of Bokaro.SpiceJet starts direct flight between Kolkata and Lilabari under UDAN scheme

Railway

Bokaro Steel City railway station lies at the edge of the Jharia Coalfield and serves the residents of Bokaro and the surrounding mining-industrial area. It is a A-category railway station, with amenities including escalators, A.C waiting rooms, a food court, charging points, a foot over-bridge, and computerised ticket reservation counters. The railway station is operated by the South Eastern Railway of the Indian Railways, and provides connectivity to neighbouring states and major metropolitan areas such as Delhi, Kolkata, Mumbai and Chennai.

Road
Dhanbad-Bokaro-Ranchi-Jamshedpur Mega Industrial Corridor Expressway was completed till Bokaro in 2018 and Bokaro-Dhanbad expansion to 6 lanes was completed in 2022. Bokaro Bus Stand is a private bus stand and land acquisition is being done in Sector-12 for new bus stand. National Highway-18 (old NH-32) and National Highway-23 which is a 4-laned till Purulia.

Education
 Among the educational facilities it had 43 primary schools, 44 middle schools, 45 secondary schools, 22 senior secondary schools, 3 general degree colleges. Bokaro Ispat Vidyalayas are a set of schools in the city of Bokaro is run by the Education Department of Bokaro Steel Limited. Popular schools in the city are- St. Xavier's School, Delhi Public School, Chinmaya Vidyalaya and Guru Gobind Singh Public School.

Sports
 Mohan Kumar Mangalam Stadium is a multi-purpose stadium in sector 4, the heart of the city.
 Senapati Cricket Stadium and cricket academy was constructed in 1995 and is currently maintained by Steel Authority of India.

Gallery

Notable people

 Shabnam Asthana, public relation expert, speaker and entrepreneur.
 Arundhati Bhattacharya, banker and former chairperson of the State Bank of India
 Kumar Deobrat, Ranchi Jharkhand team captain
 Prakash Jha, Bollywood producer, actor, director and screenwriter
 Chetan Joshi, Indian classical musician
 Sumit Kumar, cricketer of Jharkhand team
 Shahbaz Nadeem, Indian cricketer and member of Delhi Daredevils player.
 Sambit Patra, politician, BJP national spokesperson
 Samresh Singh, former MP and minister
 Shishir Parkhie - A widely acclaimed Indian Ghazal Singer, Composer & Live Performer.
 Peter Thangaraj, Indian footballer, Olympian and Arjuna awardee
 Imran Zahid, Bollywood actor & theatre artist

References

External links

 Bokaro District website
 Bokaro in Wikimapia

 
Steel Authority of India
Cities and towns in Bokaro district